Dolneni is a village in the municipality of Dolneni, North Macedonia. It is located at the center of the plain of Prilepsko Pole (Prilep field), 10 km northwest of Prilep city and it is a seat of the Dolneni municipality.

It had 11,705 inhabitants in 1994.

Demographics

According to the 2021 census, the village had a total of 300 inhabitants. Ethnic groups in the village include:

Macedonians 287
People for whom data are taken from administrative sources 11
Albanians 1
Other 1

References

Villages in Dolneni Municipality